The Bãi Cháy Bridge is a cable-stayed bridge on Highway 18, connecting Hồng Gai with Bãi Cháy over the Cửa Lục straits, separating Cửa Lục Bay with Hạ Long Bay, on the territory of Hạ Long city, Quảng Ninh province, Vietnam. Bãi Cháy Bridge is the first, and at the time of its inauguration, the longest central-line cable-stayed bridge in Vietnam.

Design
The bridge has two outer span of reinforced pre-stressed concrete box beams, which are the widest of the world for this type of bridge. The towers are located on a huge pneumatic caisson foundation system, a modern construction technology first applied in Vietnam on this project. This technique assured that vessels could still operate normally during the construction process.

The bridge was completed and opened for traffic on December 2, 2006. The bridge was built to address the needs of the people of Quảng Ninh, tourists inside and outside Vietnam, and also to complete the discontinuation of the Bãi Cháy ferry line.

Technical details
 Spans: 5 spans, main span of 
 Navigable width: 
 Load: Class A standard Japanese
 Cost: about VND 1046 billions, 40-month construction period, to November 30, 2006 termination
 Owner: Ministry of Transport, representing the owner: Project Management Unit 18-PMU18
 Design consultant - Monitor: Institute of bridges and structures in Japan
 Construction Contractor: Shimizu-Sumitomo Mitsui Construction

Gallery

See also
List of longest cable-stayed bridge spans
Transport in Vietnam
List of bridges

References 

Cable-stayed bridges in Vietnam
Bridges completed in 2006
Road bridges in Vietnam
Buildings and structures in Quảng Ninh province
Shimizu Corporation